Pieter "Piet" Johannes Alexander Salomons (14 July 1924 – 8 October 1948) was a Dutch water polo goalkeeper. He played two matches at the 1948 Summer Olympics where his team won a bronze medal. A few months after the games he committed suicide by jumping in front of an oncoming train.

See also
 Netherlands men's Olympic water polo team records and statistics
 List of Olympic medalists in water polo (men)
 List of men's Olympic water polo tournament goalkeepers

References

External links
 

1924 births
1948 deaths
People from Batavia, Dutch East Indies
Dutch male water polo players
Water polo goalkeepers
Water polo players at the 1948 Summer Olympics
Olympic bronze medalists for the Netherlands in water polo
Medalists at the 1948 Summer Olympics
Suicides in the Netherlands
Suicides by train
Dutch people of the Dutch East Indies
20th-century Dutch East Indies people